London City Ballet was a British ballet company founded in 1978. Diana, Princess of Wales was patron from 1983 to 1996. The company closed in 1996.

The company featured heavily in The Optimist, a television comedy series, in the 1985 episode 'The Light Fantastic'.

References

Ballet companies in the United Kingdom
1978 establishments in England
1996 disestablishments in England